Jovan Andjelković also spelled Jovan Anđelković (Serbian: Јован Анђелковић; Belgrade, Principality of Serbia, 31 July 1840 – Plzen, Austrian Empire, 1885) was a general of the Army of the Principality of Serbia, a professional writer, professor at the Military Academy in Belgrade. In the period from 1880 to 1882, he was the acting Chief of the Serbian General Staff. In 1879 he also served as the 5th Dean of the Academic Board and chief of the Military Academy.

Biography 
He was born in Belgrade on 31 July 1840. After completing his high school education, he enrolled at the Artillery School of the Military Academy in 1855. In time he was promoted to the rank of lieutenant when he completed the five-year course. In 1862 and 1867 two Bulgarian legions of volunteers were founded, thanks to the General Staff of the Serbian Army of which Andjelković was a member. Later, he was promoted to the rank of major (1873), lieutenant colonel (1876), colonel (1879) and general (1885).

Military career
In his military career, he performed the following important functions:
 Adjutant Commander of the Right Wing of the Defense (1862);
 Adjutant to Milan Obrenović;
 Chief of Staff of the South Morava Army (1876);
 Chief of Staff of the Drina Corps;
 Chief of the Operational Department of the Supreme Command Staff (1877-1878). 

He was also a professor and chief of the Military Academy in Belgrade.

Bibliography 
He has published several articles and books:
 "Bosnia according to Roskijević" (1876)
 "Terms for warfare" (1876)
 "Trojan War" (1882)
 "Notes from military history" (from Ratnik, books 7, 8, 11 and 12 from 1882 and 1884)

Decorations 
 Order of the Cross of Takovo with swords of the III class,
 Order of the Cross of Takovo, V class,
 Order of the White Eagle, IV class,
 Order of Danilo I,
 The Gold Medal for Zealous Service in Wars, 
 The Commemorative War Memorial of 1876-1878,
 The Romanian Star, III class, and 
 The Turkish Order of Medžedija, III class

References 

1840 births
1885 deaths